Jesin Thonikkara is an Indian professional footballer from Malappuram, Kerala who plays for East Bengal Club and its reserve team. He has represented Kerala State Football Team in Santosh Trophy. He scored five goals in Semi-final of Santosh Trophy 2021–22 against Karnataka to gain acclaim and attention. He played for Kerala United in Kerala Premiere League before joining East Bengal Club.

References 

Indian footballers
Living people
East Bengal Club players
Indian athletes
Year of birth missing (living people)
Indian male athletes